Benguela may refer to:
 Benguela, a city (the namesake capital of Benguela Province)
 Benguela (province)
 Benguela railway
 Benguela Current
 Benguela, a Capoeira rhythm